New Hope-Solebury School District is the only school district that educates children in Solebury Township, Pennsylvania; and the Borough of New Hope, Pennsylvania. New Hope-Solebury School District includes the towns of New Hope, Solebury, Lahaska, Carversville, and Lumberville, enrolling 1,303 students in 2022. Covering 28.57 square miles, New Hope-Solebury School District is relatively small and rural compared to the larger and more urbanized public school districts that surround it.

Within the school district is one elementary school (broken into two campuses), one middle school and one high school. All schools except one of the elementary schools reside on the same campus in downtown New Hope. Since 2000, both the middle school and high school have been renovated and a second elementary school campus has been added.

Elementary schools
New Hope-Solebury Lower Elementary School: Grades K-2 (Solebury, PA) 
New Hope-Solebury Upper Elementary School: Grades 3-5 (New Hope, PA)

Middle school
New Hope-Solebury Middle School: Grades 6-8 (New Hope, PA)

High school
New Hope-Solebury High School: Grades 9-12 (New Hope, PA)

References

External links
 

School districts in Bucks County, Pennsylvania